Robert I. Gruber is a former United States Air Force officer who served as an assistant to the director, Air National Guard, for special projects, as the Air National Guard assistant to the judge advocate general and as principal advisor on Air National Guard legal services matters to the judge advocate general.  His responsibilities included training oversight and operational readiness of more than 260 Air National Guard attorneys and more than 160 Air National Guard paralegals, and as chair of the judge advocate general's Air National Guard council, coordinating policies and programs for Air National Guard judge advocates and paralegals with the judge advocate general and the director, Air National Guard.

Early life
Gruber was born and raised in Port Chester, New York.

Career
Gruber served as an assistant to the director, Air National Guard, for special projects. The special projects included the proposed uniform state code of military justice and manual for courts martial. He previously served as the Air National Guard assistant to the judge advocate general, United States Air Force, Pentagon, Washington, District of Columbia.  He then served as the principal advisor on Air National Guard legal services matters to the judge advocate general.  His responsibilities included training oversight and operational readiness of more than 260 Air National Guard attorneys and more than 160 Air National Guard paralegals, and as chair of the judge advocate general's Air National Guard council, coordinating policies and programs for Air National Guard judge advocates and paralegals with the judge advocate general and the director, Air National Guard.

The general was commissioned as a judge advocate in March 1976.  In addition to his staff judge advocate assignments, he principally authored and edited the first edition of the widely acclaimed Air National Guard Commanders Legal Deskbook, which has become a staple of the libraries of every Air National Guard commander and judge advocate.  The general was also one of the Air National Guard's primary instructors and innovators of teaching methods at the Air Force Judge Advocate General's School, Maxwell Air Force Base, Alabama.

During his tenure at Maxwell, the general created the Contemporary Base Issues course, a participatory interactive problem-solving program for commanders and their key staff that was conducted six times each year and institutionalized as a mandatory program in the Air National Guard.  The general also conceived the Air National Guard Law Office course that expedited the effectiveness and familiarity of newly accessed judge advocates and paralegals with the unique law practice in an Air National Guard legal office.  In addition, the general spearheaded the design of the day-long legal curriculum and teaching methods for the Air National Guard Senior Commanders course.

In recognition of the general's contributions and accomplishments, the United States Air Force established the “Major General Robert I. Gruber Excellence in Teaching Award,” which is annually bestowed on the Air National Guard judge advocate or paralegal who best exemplifies the general's creative and innovative teaching techniques.

While serving as a traditional member of the Air Force National Guard, Gruber pursued a civilian career as an attorney.

Personal life
Gruber is married and has three daughters.

Education
1969 Franklin & Marshall College, Bachelor of Arts, Government, Lancaster, Pa.
1973 Fordham University School of Law, Juris Doctor, New York, N.Y.
1978 Squadron Officer School, by correspondence
1981 Air Command and Staff College, by correspondence
1987 Air War College, by correspondence

Awards and decorations
  Air Force Distinguished Service Medal
  Legion of Merit
  Meritorious Service Medal
  Air Force Commendation Medal 
   Air Force Outstanding Unit Award with one device
  Air Force Organizational Excellence Award
  Air Reserve Meritorious Service Medal
   Air Force Recognition Ribbon
  National Defense Service Medal
  Air Force Longevity Service Award with six oak leaf clusters
  Armed Forces Reserve Medal with twenty-year device
  Small Arms Expert Marksmanship Ribbon
  Air Force Training Ribbon
  Army Service Ribbon

Other achievements
1974 - Diplomate, National Institute for Trial Advocacy
1992 - National Guard Bureau Minuteman Award as Air National Guard Judge Advocate of the Year
1992 - 1998 - Recording Secretary of The Judge Advocate General's Air National Guard Council
1993 - Outstanding Reserve Judge Advocate of the Year in Air Mobility Command
1993 - Reginald C. Harmon Award as United States Air Force Outstanding Reserve Judge Advocate of the Year
1994 - Author of three-volume Judge Advocate General's Air National Guard Council History
1994 - 1998 - Adjunct faculty member and lecturer at Air Force Judge Advocate General's School and creator of "JAG Jeopardy" teaching format

Effective dates of promotions

References

1947 births
Living people